Diarmaid Riabach Ó Seachnasaigh, Chief of the Name, died 1579.

Annalistic references

 M1573.6. Murrough, the son of Dermot, son of Murrough O'Brien, was slain by Ulick Burke, the son of Rickard, who was son of Ulick-na-gCeann, and O'Shaughnessy, i.e. Dermot Reagh, the son of Dermot, who was son of William, son of John Boy. O'Shaughnessy was the man who laid hands on him. John Burke deprived O'Shaughnessy of Gort-insi-Guaire, in revenge of the killing of his kinsman.

References

 D'Alton, John, Illustrations, Historical and Genealogical, of King James's Irish Army List (1689). Dublin: 1st edition (single volume), 1855. pp. 328–32.
 History of Galway, James Hardiman, 1820
 Tabular pedigrees of O'Shaughnessy of Gort (1543–1783), Martin J. Blake, Journal of the Galway Archaeological and Historical Society, vi (1909–10), p. 64; vii (1911–12), p. 53.
 John O'Donovan. The Genealogies, Tribes, and Customs of Hy-Fiachrach. Dublin: Irish Archaeological Society. 1844. Pedigree of O'Shaughnessy: pp. 372–91.
 Old Galway, Professor Mary Donovan O'Sullivan, 1942
 Galway: Town and Gown, edited Moran et al., 1984
 Galway: History and Society, 1996

People from County Galway
Diarmaid Riabach
16th-century Irish people